Vox is a German free-to-air television channel launched on 25 January 1993 and owned by RTL Group. The channel mainly broadcasts documentaries and US series and movies.

An integral part of the night program is the series Medical Detectives / Forensic Files, which regularly gets very high ratings, sometimes up to 20%, which is rather unusual for the broadcaster.

History
VOX started transmitting on 25 January 1993, replacing Lifestyle. It competed with public television by broadcasting many live and informational programmes. The channel was originally owned by an assortment of German media companies:
UFA (Bertelsmann) – 24.9%
Westdeutsche Medienbeteiligungsgesellschaft (West German Media Holding Company) – 25.1%
Holtzbrinck-Verlag (Holtzbrinck Publishing House) – 14.5%
Warner Music Germany – 14.5%
Development Company for Television Program (DCTP) – 11%
Mittelständische Unternehmensbeteiligung (Middle Class Business Holdings) – 10%

The director of programming at launch was Ruprecht Eser. One year after the channel's launch it seemed clear that the original programme concept would not work. Market share among the target group relevant for advertisers was at 1.5%, too low to attract much advertising. VOX took significant losses. By February 1994, all the original partners except UFA and DCTP sold their stakes. As a result of the losses, the quality of programmes began to decline. VOX had to repeat its movies every few weeks to fill the schedule. On 1 April 1994, VOX went into liquidation. More than 250 employees were laid off.

VOX's logo consists of the letters V and X, with a red circle "eye" using negative space to create the O.

By November 1994 VOX had new owners:
News German Television Holding (News Corporation) – 49.9%
Canal+ – 24.9%
UFA (Bertelsmann) – 24.9%
DCTP – 0.3%

Gradually, VOX gained a foothold in the German television landscape. In 1998, VOX signed an output deal with 20th Century Fox, leading to more series and movies being broadcast alongside magazine-style shows. In December 1999, RTL Television bought out News Corporation. A short time later, canal+ sold its share to UFA (Bertelsmann AG). 99.7% of the channel now belonged to RTL Group, with the remaining 0.3% held by DCTP.

Now, VOX is the most successful private television station of the so-called "second generation".  The channel had so much success with series such as CSI and CSI: Miami that they were transferred to the more widely watched sister channel RTL Television. CSI: NY gets a market share of up to 21% on VOX.

Audience share in March 2008 was 5.4%, with share amongst 14- to 49-year-olds at 7.4%. In the 2011/12 television season, VOX had a 5.6% share of all viewers, making it the sixth-most watched channel, and 7.4% among viewers aged 14–49, making it the fourth-most watched channel by that demographic.

Logos

Audience share

Germany

The average age of the viewers is 48.6 years (as of 2016).

References

External links

 Official Site
 15 Jahre VOX

RTL Group
Television stations in Germany
Television stations in Austria
Television stations in Switzerland
Television channels and stations established in 1993
Mass media in Cologne
VOX (German TV channel)